The 1996 470-European-Sailing-Championship was held between June 6 and 15 1996. It was discharged before Hayling Island.

And was extended in both a women's and a men's competition 470-boat class, in which the Russian men Berezkin / Burmatnow and among women the Ukrainians Taran / Pakholchyk after twelve races the European title won.

Results

Men

Women

External links 
 Results men
 Results women

470 European Championships
1996 in sailing
1996 in British sport
Sailing competitions in the United Kingdom